Christopher Nigel James (born 28 December 1978 in Luton, Bedfordshire) is a British auto racing driver.

Racing career

James competed in the Fiat Racing challenge between 2000 and 2005 at the wheel of a Fiat Punto, taking several wins. He returned to racing in 2008, driving in selected rounds of the Mini Challenge. After half a season in 2009, he contested a full campaign in 2010 with one race win & finished third in class.

In 2011 he competed in the British Touring Car Championship. He drove a Chevrolet Lacetti for his own ES Racing team, his best finish throughout the season was a twelfth place at Donington.

In 2012 Team ES Racing.com acquired two ex-Triple Eight Vauxhall Vectra for himself and Dave Newsham. Newsham would take two wins over the course of the season, whereas James' best finishes came at Brands Hatch and Silverstone where he finished in 12th place.

Since 2014, James has raced sporadically in the Mini Challenge - taking a single podium in 2014.

James competed in the Dubai 24 hour race in 2016, co-driving with Rebecca Jackson.

Complete British Touring Car Championship results
(key) (Races in bold indicate pole position – 1 point awarded in first race) (Races in italics indicate fastest lap – 1 point awarded all races) (* signifies that driver lead race for at least one lap – 1 point given all races)

References

External links
BTCC official site

Living people
English racing drivers
1978 births
British Touring Car Championship drivers
Mini Challenge UK drivers
24H Series drivers